Richard Koszarski (born December 18, 1947) is a film historian. 

He was formerly the chief curator at the American Museum of the Moving Image in New York. He was the founder of Film History: An International Journal, and served as editor-in-chief from 1987 to 2012. He is a professor emeritus of English and film at Rutgers University in New Jersey.

His collection of material on the early history of the Universal Pictures is held in the Library of Congress.

Books
 Hollywood Directors, 1941-1976 (editor) (Oxford University Press, 1977)
 An Evening’s Entertainment: The Rise of The Silent Feature Picture (University of California Press, 1990)
 Von: The Life and Films of Erich von Stroheim (Limelight, 2001), original title The Man You Loved to Hate: Erich Von Stroheim and Hollywood
 Fort Lee, the Film Town (Indiana University Press, 2004)
 Hollywood on the Hudson: Film and Television in New York from Griffith to Sarnoff (Rutgers University Press, 2008).
 “Keep ‘Em in the East”: Kazan, Kubrick and the Postwar New York Renaissance  (Columbia University Press, 2021)

References

External links
 Google Scholar: Richard Koszarski
 Research Gate: Richard Koszarski

Living people

1947 births
Film historians